Reggie White may refer to:

 Reggie White (1961–2004), American football player
 Reggie White (defensive lineman, born 1970), American football player
 Reggie White (running back) (born 1979), American football player